A coregency is the situation where a monarchical position (such as prince, princess, king, queen, emperor or empress), normally held by only a single person, is held by two or more. It is to be distinguished from diarchies or duumvirates such as ancient Sparta and Rome along with a regency where the monarch in most cases infant or incapacitated particularly has a senior above him and exercises no power whatsoever apart from legally holding the position of Head of State.

Andorra 

Co-principality is a distinct but related system employed in contemporary Andorra, where monarchical power is formally divided between two rulers.

Historical examples
Coregencies were common in the Hellenistic period; according to one scholar, they "can usually be explained as a means of avoiding crises of succession or internal conflict, and of strengthening dynastic identity and ideology." Other examples include the coregency of Frederick I of Austria and Louis the Bavarian over the Kingdom of Germany. Jure uxoris Kings in Kingdoms such as Spain and Portugal can also be found (Ferdinand V and Isabella I of Castile, Philip I and Joanna of Castile, Peter III and Maria I of Portugal, etc.). In Navarre, the husbands of queens regnant were styled as co-rulers.

Ancient Egypt

In Ancient Egypt, coregency was quite problematic as the Pharaoh was seen as the incarnation/representation of the god Horus. Therefore, according to the divine order Ma'at, only one King could exist at the same time. Yet, exceptions can be found., mainly in the Middle Kingdom, where the  occasionally appointed his successor (often one of his sons) as coregent, or joint king, to ensure a smooth succession. “This system was used, from at least as early as the Middle Kingdom, in order to ensure that the transfer of power took place with the minimum of disruption and instability”. Coregencies are highly probable for Amenemhat I > Senusret I > Amenemhat II > Senusret II. Most probably the real king in power was the older one (father) adopting the younger ruler (son), while the co-regent had to wait until after the death of the older one to really have access to full royal power. Yet, the years of reigns normally were counted from the beginning of the coregency on. Due to this and to the fragmentary character of known sources, the establishment of Egyptian chronology was quite complicated and remains disputed up to date. Yet, understanding the existence of co-regency reduced the chaos quite a lot.

The institution of coregency is different from that of vice-regency, where an adult person (in Ancient Egypt often the mother of the king) functions as Legal guardian, ruling in the name of the underage king. Some of the female vice-regents of Egypt rose to a status of equal to the God-Kings, becoming co-rulers as can be seen in the famous case of Hatshepsut. After the death of her husband Thutmose II, Hatshepsut ruled in the name of Thutmose III, her nephew and stepson. Then, latest in year 7 of Thutmose III's reign, she took over royal regalia and was then titled King of Egypt under the Throne name (prenomen) Maatkare. For later periods of Pharaonic Egyptian history, the existence of the institution of coregency has been put into question by Egyptologists, while, "the Ptolemaic and Roman period examples being the most securely identified".

Ancient Israel

In the book The Mysterious Numbers of the Hebrew Kings, Edwin R. Thiele proposed co-regency as a possible explanation for discrepancies in the dates given in the Hebrew Bible for the reigns of the kings of Israel and Judah. At least one co-regency is explicitly documented in the Bible: the coronation of King Solomon occurred before the death of his father David.

Ancient Rome
It was common during the Principate for a Roman emperor or Augustus to appoint Caesar as designated heir and junior co-emperor. This was merely a tradition and not a formal office until the Tetrarchy, which attempted to codify this arrangement, but quickly fell apart.

Britain

King Henry II of England installed his eldest surviving son, also named Henry, as junior king. Henry the Young King was not permitted to exercise royal authority and his title as co-king was effectively a sinecure to denote his status as his father's chosen heir. Young Henry predeceased his father without ever ascending to the throne and is not included in the official list of English monarchs.

The monarchy of England experienced joint rule under the terms of the act sanctioning the marriage of Mary I to Philip II of Spain. Philip notionally reigned as king of England (inclusive of Wales) and Ireland by right of his wife from 1554 to 1558. Similarly, following the Glorious Revolution, Mary II and her husband William III held joint sovereignty over the kingdoms of England, Scotland, and Ireland from 1688 to 1694.

France
Following the extinction of the Carolingian dynasty in West Francia, the Western Frankish nobles elected Hugh Capet as their new king. Upon his ascension Hugh secured the election of his only son Robert as his co-king. As such, when Hugh died it did not trigger an election for a new king, nor did Robert necessarily "inherit" the crown, but simply continued his kingship. Subsequent Capetian kings would also name their eldest son or brother as co-ruler, until the tradition of agnatic primogeniture was sufficiently established to transform the King of France from an elected monarch to a hereditary one.

Lithuania

The Lithuanian Grand Dukes typically selected submonarchs from their families or loyal subjects to assist controlling the Grand Duchy. However, the Grand Dukes remained superior.
Vytenis (superior) and Gediminas
Gediminas (superior) and an unknown duke of Trakai, presumably Gediminas's son.
Algirdas (superior) and Kęstutis
Jogaila (superior) and Kęstutis

The title was not used by any other king of Poland after Jogaila.
 Vytautas (Grand Duke) and Jogaila (Supreme Duke)
 Švitrigaila (Grand Duke) and Jogaila (Supreme Duke) for a brief period, until Švitrigaila declared war on Poland
 Sigismund I of Lithuania (Grand Duke) and Jogaila (Supreme Duke) until Jogaila's death.

Russia

Following the death of Tsar Feodor III of Russia in 1682, his brother Ivan and half-brother Peter were both crowned autocrats of Russia. This compromise was necessary because Ivan was unfit to rule due to physical and mental disabilities, while Peter's exclusive rule was opposed by Feodor and Ivan's older sister Sofia Alekseyevna, who led a Streltsy uprising against him and his mother's family. Because neither Tsar was of age to rule, Sofia subsequently claimed regency until she was removed from power by Peter in 1689. Ivan V and Peter I's joint reign continued, however, with Ivan maintaining formal seniority despite having little participation in the affairs of the state until his death in 1696, at which point Peter became the sole ruler.

Sweden

The monarchy in Sweden has had several periods of joint rule: Erik and Alrik, Yngvi and Alf, Björn at Hauge and Anund Uppsale, Eric the Victorious and Olof Björnsson, Eric the Victorious and Olof Skötkonung, Halsten Stenkilsson and Inge I, and Philip and Inge II.

Vietnam
Coregency is a special feature of the Trần dynasty, in which a senior king abdicated in favor of his chosen heir. This abdication, however, is only in name, as the abdicated king continued to rule while his successor sat on the throne as a learner.

China
Co-regency was common amongst the Chinese ethnics both formally or informally dating far back to the Han Dynasty to the Late Qing dynasty, if it happened to be so that a new Emperor ascended the throne and was mature but not well adept with politics, it was a national concern for stability in which the monarch was the head of State de jure whereas a co-regent was its de facto ruler.

The requirements for the position of co-regent depended on the power of an individual along with their ability to command the Confidence of the Parliament and it could be an official in the Imperial Court, a close and trustworthy paternal or maternal relative or the most appropriate being the Most Senior Member of the Imperial family in the Palace which was either the Grand Empress Dowager or the Empress Dowager. The absence of all these specific personalities could rarely pave way for the monarch's wife if she seemed more competent.

The most outstanding co-regencies were those of Empress Wu Zetian during the Tang Dynasty in the reign of her husband that Gaozong Emperor even if it was informal, the Empress Dowager Xiang became co-regent for the Emperor Huizong of Song, her adopted son in 1100 while the Grand Empress Dowager Wu became co-regent of the Emperor Guangzong of Southern Song in the year 1189 even if his Empress Li Fengniang later posthumously honored as Ciyi became the de facto ruler, Empress Dowager Yang served as co-regent of the Emperor Lizong from 1224 until her death in 1233 even if she soon surpassed his own influence and ruled ultimately like an Empress Regnant even if she was never actually one. During the Qing Dynasty the Empress Dowagers Ci'an of the Manchu Niohuru clan along with Ci'xi of the Manchu Yehenara clan served as Co-regents from 1861 until Ci'an's death in 1881 where Ci'xi became sole regent for the Guanxu Emperor until she was overthrown in 1908, it was more interesting during her time that Ci'an particularly specialized in handling the affairs of the Imperial family and left Ci'xi to dominate the political scene much as contemporary history suggests that Ci'an was more willing to keep Ci'xi as her ally than to make her an enemy given the fact that Ci'xi welded more political power than she ever did she in turn eliminated any form of competition for supremacy with the latter even if she was Senior to her.

Co-principality
The only co-principality in the world is Andorra, a small South-western European country located on the Iberian Peninsula. As part of a peace agreement, joint rule between the Count of Foix and the Bishop of Urgell was established by a formal act of Paréage in 1278. The counts' right eventually passed to the French state, and joint rule between France (now embodied by its president) and the Bishop of Urgell was codified in the Constitution of Andorra in 1993.

See also
Condominium (international law)
Diarchy
Jure uxoris
Personal union

References

Monarchy
Collective heads of state